The Varnița is a right tributary of the river Miletin in Romania. It flows into the Miletin in Flămânzi.

References

Rivers of Romania
Rivers of Botoșani County